2014 Four Nations might refer to:

2014 Rugby League Four Nations
2014 Four Nations Tournament (women's football)

See also
2014 Four Nationals Figure Skating Championships